Juan Carlos Barbieri (October 8, 1932 – December 11, 1996) was an Argentine stage and film actor. He was married to the actress Inés Moreno from 1957 until 1965, with whom he had a daughter Andrea Barbieri. He had earlier been in a relationship with Norma Giménez.

Selected filmography
 The Drummer of Tacuarí (1954)

References

Bibliography 
Pellettieri, Osvaldo. De Eduardo De Filippo a Tita Merello. Editorial Galerna, 2003.

External links 
 

1932 births
1996 deaths
Argentine male film actors
Male actors from Buenos Aires
20th-century Argentine male actors